Walter Ricardo Vílchez Soto (born 20 February 1982) is a Peruvian former footballer who last played for Comerciantes Unidos in the Segunda División Peruana.

He made 64 appearances for the Peru national football team.

He is the older brother of Óscar Vílchez.

Club career
Vílchez made his league debut in the Torneo Descentralizado in the 2000 season playing for Deportivo Wanka. In the following two seasons he played for, successively, smaller clubs Unión Minas and Sport Coopsol Trujillo. In 2003, he joined top Peruvian club Alianza Lima, who were national champions in 2003 and 2004. In the first half of 2005 Vilchez played with Club Olimpo de Bahía Blanca (Argentina). In the second half of 2005 he returned to Peru to play for Sporting Cristal and won the 2005 league title.

In 2007, he went to Mexico to play for Club Deportivo Cruz Azul. He then went to Puebla F.C. on loan and became an important player for the club, remaining there until 2009. At the start of the following year, it became official, according to his representative, that Club Atlante attempted to sign him for one year. However, after several days training in Cancún, the club's president announced that his move would not be possible given that there were no more places for a foreign player on the team roster.

Vilchez returned to Peru in 2009, signing with Cienciano. After one year at the club he rejoined Alianza Lima. In 2011, he joined Sporting Cristal and helped the club capture a league title in 2012.

On 26 February 2013, Major League Soccer club Chivas USA announced they had signed Vílchez along with Mexican defender Joaquín Velázquez, reuniting with their former coach at Puebla F.C. José Luis Sánchez Solá. Vílchez and Chivas USA parted company on 26 July 2013.

Walter returned to Peru and joined the club UTC for the 2014 season

Honours

Club
Alianza Lima
Torneo Descentralizado: 2003, 2004

Sporting Cristal
Torneo Descentralizado: 2005, 2012

Country 
Peru national team
Copa América: Bronze medal 2011

References

External links

1982 births
Living people
People from Chiclayo
Association football central defenders
Association football fullbacks
Peruvian footballers
Peru international footballers
Peruvian expatriate footballers
Peruvian Primera División players
Club Deportivo Wanka footballers
Unión Minas footballers
Sport Coopsol Trujillo footballers
Club Alianza Lima footballers
Olimpo footballers
Sporting Cristal footballers
Cruz Azul footballers
Club Puebla players
Cienciano footballers
Chivas USA players
Universidad Técnica de Cajamarca footballers
Real Garcilaso footballers
Peruvian expatriate sportspeople in Argentina
Peruvian expatriate sportspeople in Mexico
Liga MX players
Major League Soccer players
Expatriate footballers in Argentina
Expatriate footballers in Mexico
Expatriate soccer players in the United States
2001 Copa América players
2004 Copa América players
2007 Copa América players
2011 Copa América players